The Con Moong cave (Vietnamese: Hang Con Moong, "beast" cave) is located in the Cúc Phương National Park, just south of Mọ village, in the Thanh Hóa Province, northern Vietnam. The Department of Culture has issued a certificate that declares Con Moong prehistoric site and its surroundings as National Relics and is managed by the Cúc Phương National Park administration, along with a refuge for rare animals. Among these locations, the archaeological site of Con Moong cave is of central importance for the study of the Mesolithic Hoabinhian culture. In April and May 1976, Vietnamese archaeologists excavated the site.

Site description
The cave has two entrances that connect with one another. Ten strata, including the cave floor and the top crust (prefeudal to modern) were found and recorded in the cultural sediments.

The  Con Moong Cave may be one of the archaeological sites with the thickest cultural layers in Vietnam. Based on the structure of soil layers and typical items, the soil layers can be classified into three different cultural layers:

 Down from the surface, layers 2, 3, and 4 belong to cultural layer III, which is the most recent. In this layer they found out some cobble tools, such as a Hòa Bình-style axe with blade, or Bắc Sơn-style and pottery. This is typical for Hòa Bình or Bắc Sơn culture.
 Layers 6 and 7 belong to cultural layer II. Most of the tools found here present the typical features of Hòa Bình culture. The stone tools such as cutting tool with almond form, oval form, rectangular form; scraper of plate form, short axe, bone sharpen head tool, scraper of mother of pearl. The huddled tomb with yellow soil found here is also popular in Hòa Bình excavation sites.
 Layer 9 is cultural layer I, the earliest. The typical stone tools with usable edges were covering one quarter of the cobble; there were also some fragments of broken wine bottles. These tools are typical for Sơn Vi culture, proving that Hòa Bình culture comes from Sơn Vi culture.

Layers 5 and 8 are thin, with thickness from 10 to 25 cm, having burnt spots and inorganic material. They are the boundary line dividing the 3 cultural layers.

In all cultural layers, traces of cooking can be seen, the later ones being nearer to the cave entrance. Together with the kitchen areas are the shells of mollusc, such as Cyclophorus, Camraena, Hybocystis, Antirnelania, Lanceolaria sp. nohyriopsls, Ozynaia, and Meretrix. Some of these molluscs are in situ, others smashed, closely mixed with each other or scattered in the soil.

History
Due to its long history of uninterrupted occupation, the Con Moong site is of great significance for the understanding of Vietnamese and South East Asian prehistory. Techniques to make cobble tools were continuously applied at the site during the Sơn Vi culture the Hòa Bình culture and the Bắc Sơn culture. A continuous sequence of human cultural evolution with a distinct regionl character, from the end of the old stone age, through the middle stone age, to the new stone age, from hunter-gatherer culture to agriculture has occurred at the site.

The development from the Old Stone Age to the New Stone Age in Vietnam also implies a change from the Pleistocene to the Holocene. Cultural layers I and II have various floristic compositions, which means that there is only sporoplasm (Polypodiaceae, Cyatheaceae) but not pollen; and vice versa, there is only pollen (Chenopodiaceae, Leguminosae, Rubiaceae, Myricaceae, Mzliaceae, Fagaceac) but not sporoplasm in cultural layer II.

At present there are 17 generations C14 for cultural layers in different depths of the Con Moong excavation site. The duration between Pleistocene and Holocene of the Quaternary period in Vietnam that is more or less 10,000 years ago.

In the Con Moong archaeological site, the existence of Sơn Vi culture at the end of the Old Stone Age has been reconfirmed by stratum document. Moreover, formerly Sơn Vi culture has been only known as existing before Hòa Bình culture but now it is known more clearly that it had been integrated with Hòa Bình culture at the utmost.

Through the tombs found in cultural layers II and I, we have found out about the Sơn Vi ancient people. The mollusks, yellow soil, and stone wares buried together with the dead people suggest that there is a connection between Sơn Vi and Hòa Bình people based on the burial forms. The stone wares in layer II are of the Hòa Bình culture, but are big not small, and quite different from the European mesolithic. It means that in the mesolithic or epipaleolithic, people here did not use the bow and arrow as others, but rather the abundance of bamboo allowed them to use bows and cross-bows without armature, as in many other places.

Layer III is of the Bắc Sơn culture, similar to Hòa Bình II that had been put forward before by M. Colani. Hòa Bình II or Bắc Sơn culture really belongs to the New Stone Age, with the appearance of axes with ground blades and pottery. With blade axes, the human beings had gained great achievement in production techniques of stone wares, the beginning for the New Stone Age revolution in Vietnam and the region.

World Heritage status
This site was added to the UNESCO World Heritage Tentative List on 21 June 2006, in the Cultural category.

Notes

References

Archaeological sites in Vietnam
Landforms of Thanh Hóa province
Caves of Vietnam